St Augustine's Church of England High School is a Voluntary Aided Church of England secondary school in the West London borough of Westminster, Kilburn. The school is also a Science College and has a sixth form. St Augustine of Canterbury is the patron saint of the school. It is located adjacent to its affiliated primary school and parish church St Augustine's Church.

History
The school was opened on 16 May 1870 in Andover Place with seven students, with specifically the High School opening in 1884 as an all boys' secondary school; the present division into primary and secondary schools being complete by 1951. In 1969, the present school buildings were opened, with St. Augustine's High School becoming a Church of England comprehensive school.

In February 2009, the school received investment under the BSF program for schools. The work was completed in late 2011. In May 2010 the school was given a sports centre used by both the school and the local community.

Layout
The main school consists of two buildings, a larger teaching block and a smaller guest block, connected by a bridge. The teaching block is where most of the classrooms and the science laboratories are. The only subjects taught at the guest block are Music, Physical Education and Business Studies.

The layout for the school body are that there are five principal forms each named after a saint, namely -
Aidan of Lindisfarne
Bede
Columba
Saint David
Saint Edward
Saint Felix

These forms are used during 'form time' and occasions such as sport days or are remembered during mass at the end of every term.

Notable former pupils
Julian Golding, Commonwealth games Gold Medal-winning British sprinter
Ali Milani, Labour Party politician
Dwayne Kerr, British entrepreneur
Bradley Wiggins, Gold Medal-winning British Olympic cyclist

References

External links
Official Website
Teachweb Page
School net page

Secondary schools in the City of Westminster
Educational institutions established in 1884
1884 establishments in England
Church of England secondary schools in the Diocese of London
Voluntary aided schools in London
Kilburn, London